Anna and the King is a 1999 American biographical period drama film directed by Andy Tennant and written by Steve Meerson and Peter Krikes. Loosely based on the 1944 novel Anna and the King of Siam, which gives a fictionalized account of the diaries of Anna Leonowens, it stars Jodie Foster and Chow Yun-fat in the titular roles.

The story concerns Anna Leonowens, an English school teacher in Siam during the late 19th century, who becomes the teacher of King Mongkut's many children and wives. It was mostly shot in Malaysia, particularly in the Penang, Ipoh and Langkawi region.

Anna and the King was released in the United States on December 17, 1999 by 20th Century Fox. The film was subject to controversy when the Thai government deemed it historically inaccurate and insulting to the royal family and banned its distribution in the country. It received mixed reviews from critics who praised the production values, costume design, and musical score but criticised its screenplay and length, as well as Foster's choice to play the character which many deemed a role that required her to play beneath her intelligence. The film grossed $114 million worldwide, against its $92 million budget. It received two nominations at the 72nd Academy Awards: Best Art Direction and Best Costume Design.

Kate Winslet was offered the role of Anna after the huge success of Titanic, but turned it down along with the lead part in Shakespeare in Love to do the independent film Hideous Kinky.

Plot
Anna Leonowens (Jodie Foster), a British widow, has come to Siam with her son Louis (Tom Felton) to teach English to Crown Prince Chulalongkorn, the heir of King Mongkut (Chow Yun-fat). She is a strong-willed, intelligent, valiant and benevolent woman for her time, which pleases the King. Mongkut wants to modernize Siam, thinking this will help his country resist colonialism and protect the ancient traditions that provide Siam its identity. For this reason, he has Anna teach all of his dozens of children, born to twenty-three wives.

Initially, Mongkut and Anna clash due to cultural differences as well as their equally strong wills. He soon sees the positive effects of her teaching methods, especially her determination to treat the princes and princesses as though they were ordinary schoolchildren. Anna's abolitionist views also help to influence Chulalongkorn's views on slavery.

Mongkut and Anna discuss differences between Eastern and Western love, but he dismisses the notion that a man can be happy with only one wife. Hoping to impress Britain's ambassadors, Mongkut orders a sumptuous reception and appoints Anna to organize it. During the reception, the King spars graciously and wittily with Sir Mycroft Kincaid (Bill Stewart), of the East India Company. The Europeans express their beliefs that Siam is a superstitious, backward nation. Anna powerfully argues that this is not the case. Mongkut dances with Anna at the reception.

Siam is under siege from what appears to be a British-funded coup d'état against King Mongkut, using Burmese soldiers. Mongkut sends his brother Prince Chaofa (Kay Siu Lim) and military advisor General Alak (Randall Duk Kim) and their troops to investigate. Alak, however, betrays the prince and poisons his own soldiers, revealing he is actually the coup's leader. The king is brought the news that his brother and general are dead.

Anna grows closer to the royal children, particularly Princess Fa-Ying (Melissa Campbell), who adores the playful monkeys who live in the royal garden's trees. When Fa-Ying falls sick with cholera, Anna is summoned to her chambers to say goodbye. She gets there just as Fa-Ying dies in King Mongkut's arms, and the two mourn together. Mongkut later finds that one of the monkeys "borrowed" his glasses as his daughter (Goh Yi Wai) used to do.  He believes that reincarnation will alleviate his grief, and Fa-Ying might be reborn as one of her beloved animals.

Anna also begins to educate Lady Tuptim (Bai Ling), the King's newest concubine, who was already in love with another man, Khun Phra Balat (Sean Ghazi), when she was brought to court. Mongkut is kind to her, but Tuptim yearns for her true love. After Balat becomes a Buddhist monk, Tuptim disguises herself as a monk as well so she can join his monastery and be near him. She is tracked down and put on trial, where it is revealed Balat has been viciously tortured. When Tuptim condemns the judges for their cruelty, she is caned.

Anna, unable to bear the sight, speaks out angrily in an attempt to stop the abuse and threatens to go to the king, before she is forcibly removed from the court. Her outburst prevents Mongkut from showing clemency, because he cannot be seen as beholden to her, though he feels ashamed. Tuptim and Balat are beheaded publicly.

Anna resolves to leave Siam as many others are fleeing due to the approaching Burmese army. Sir Mycroft approaches the Siamese prime minister and reveals that in an attempt to protect his interests in Siam, he's paid a small fortune to discover who is behind the attempted coup: Alak.

Mongkut's army is too far from the palace to engage the rebels, so he creates a ruse - that a white elephant has been spotted, and the court must go to see it. This allows him to flee the palace with his children and wives, and give his armies time to reach them. The prime minister convinces Anna to return and help Mongkut, since her presence in his entourage will corroborate the tale about the white elephant. Mongkut plans to take his family to a monastery where he spent part of his life. Halfway through the journey, they see Alak's army in the distance and realize they can't outrun him. Mongkut and his soldiers set explosives on a wooden bridge high above a canyon floor as Alak and his army approach. Mongkut orders his "army" to stay back and rides to the bridge with only two soldiers. Alak, at the head of his army, confronts Mongkut on the bridge.

Anna, Louis and Mongkut's wives and children create a brilliant deception from their hiding spot in the forest. Louis uses his horn to replicate the sound of a bugle charge, as the others "attack" the area with harmless fireworks. The Burmese, believing the King has brought British soldiers, panic and retreat. Alak's attempt to recall and regroup his troops fails. Alak stands alone, but Mongkut refuses to kill him, saying that Alak will have to live with his shame. As Mongkut turns to ride back to Siam, Alak grabs his gun and aims at his back, but one of Mongkut's guards detonates the explosives, blowing the bridge and Alak to pieces.

The court returns to Bangkok, where Anna tearfully prepares to leave Siam for good. Mongkut shares one last dance with her, marveling that he now understands how a man could be content with only one woman. A voice-over tells viewers that Chulalongkorn became king after his father's death, abolishing slavery and instituting religious freedom with his father's 'vision' assisting him.

Cast

 Jodie Foster as Anna Leonowens
 Chow Yun-Fat as King Mongkut
 Bai Ling as Tuptim
 Tom Felton as Louis T. Leonowens
 Randall Duk Kim as General Alak
 Lim Kay Siu as Prince Chaofa, King Mongkut's Brother
 Melissa Campbell as Princess Fa-Ying
 Deanna Yusoff as Queen Thiang
 Geoffrey Palmer as Lord John Bradley
 Ann Firbank as Lady Bradley
 Bill Stewart as Mycroft Kincaid, East India Trading Co.
 Sean Ghazi as Khun Phra Balat
 Syed Alwi as The Kralahome, Prime Minister
 Ramli Hassan as King Chulalongkorn
 Keith Chin as Prince Chulalongkorn
 Kenneth Tsang as Justice Phya Phrom
 Shantini Venugopal as the nanny
 Goh Yi Wai as Mongkut's daughter
 Zaibo as Siamese Trader
 Patrick Teoh as Third Judge
 Kee Thuan Chye as Second Judge 
 Harith Iskander as Nikorn
 Afdlin Shauki as Interpreter
 Mano Maniam as Moonshee
 Dharma Harun Al-Rashid as Noi
 Mahmud Ali Basha as Mercenary
 Aimi Aziz as Lady of Court No.1 
 Ellie Suriati as Lady of Court No.2
 Tan Siew Ting Lee as Lady of Court No.3
 Ruby Wong as Lady of Court No.4
 Zaridah Abdul Malik as Lady of Court No.5
 Yank Kassim as Pitak

Reception
Anna and the King received mixed reviews. On Rotten Tomatoes, it holds a 51% rating, based on 101 reviews, with an average rating of 5.87/10. The consensus reads, "Beautiful cinematography can't prevent Anna and the King from being boring and overly lengthy." Metacritic gave the film a score of 56 based on 32 reviews, indicating "mixed or average reviews". On a $92 million budget, the film grossed $114 million worldwide.

Controversy
After reviewing the script, with changes having been made to try to satisfy them, the Thai government did not allow the film-makers to film in Thailand. The Thai authorities did not permit the film to be distributed in Thailand due to scenes that they construed as a disrespectful and historically inaccurate depiction of King Mongkut.

Tony Dabbs wrote an opinion piece for the Thai newspaper The Nation, criticizing the ban, advocating the use of strong disclaimers, and expanding the issue beyond this picture, saying: “Frankly, I would like to see all films that take strong liberties with the historical facts, as Braveheart and JFK did, also be required to state so at the end of the film”.

References

External links

 
 
 
 
 

1999 films
1999 romantic drama films
20th Century Fox films
American romantic drama films
1990s English-language films
Films scored by George Fenton
Drama films based on actual events
Films directed by Andy Tennant
Films produced by Lawrence Bender
Films set in Thailand
Films set in the 19th century
Films shot in Malaysia
Films about interclass romance
Films about interracial romance
Monarchy in fiction
Films set in the Victorian era
Films with screenplays by Peter Krikes
Films with screenplays by Steve Meerson
Cultural depictions of Anna Leonowens
Cultural depictions of Mongkut
Censored films
Works based on Anna and the King of Siam
Film controversies in Thailand
1990s American films